Kujtim Bala (born 25 May 1990) is a Swedish former footballer of Kosovar descent.

Career
Starting his career in Veddige BK, he moved at the age of 15 to Halmstads BK in 2005. In 2007, he made a one-year stay in Varbergs BoIS FC before returning to Halmstads BK the following year and on 12 July 2009 he made his debut for the senior team against GAIS when he came on as a substitute for Christian Järdler in the 59th minute.

On 16 November 2009 he was raised from the youth squad and was given a place in the senior team.

In the 2011 season Bala featured 19 times for Halmstads BK scoring once. After the season his contract expired and he decided to rejoin his former club Varbergs BoIS FC. However the season was immediately cut short as he suffered an ACL injury even before the pre-season had started.

National team
Kujtim Bala was called up to Kosovo national team for an exhibition game against his club Halmstads BK on 10 June 2010, along with his teammate Anel Raskaj. Bala started the game on the bench and came on in 60th minute and scored Kosovos fourth goal in the 71st minute.

Honours

Club 

 Halmstads BK
 Allsvenskan U21: 2009

References

External links

1990 births
Living people
Kosovan men's footballers
Kosovo pre-2014 international footballers
Swedish men's footballers
Swedish people of Kosovan descent
Association football midfielders
Allsvenskan players
Dalkurd FF players
Halmstads BK players
Varbergs BoIS players
Östersunds FK players
IK Sirius Fotboll players